Willi Agatz (10 June 1904 – 29 August 1957) was a German politician of the Communist Party (KPD) and former member of the German Bundestag.

Life 
From 1946 until his election to the Bundestag, Agatz was a member of the state parliament in North Rhine-Westphalia. From the 1949 Bundestag elections until 1953 he was a member of the German Bundestag.

Literature

References 

 
1904 births 
1957 deaths
Bavaria Party politicians
Members of the Bundestag for North Rhine-Westphalia
Members of the Bundestag 1949–1953
Members of the Bundestag for the Communist Party of Germany
Members of the Landtag of North Rhine-Westphalia